The following is a list of notable deaths in July 2008.

Entries for each day are listed alphabetically by surname. A typical entry lists information in the following sequence:
 Name, age, country of citizenship at birth, subsequent country of citizenship (if applicable), reason for notability, cause of death (if known), and reference.

July 2008

1
Abdullahi Afrah, 55, Somalian islamist, shot.
Aleksei Argun, 71, Abkhazian politician.
Keith Charles, 74, American actor, lung cancer.
Clay Felker, 82, American editor and journalist (New York magazine), throat cancer.
Mel Galley, 60, British guitarist (Trapeze, Whitesnake, Phenomena), esophageal cancer.
Mogens Glistrup, 82, Danish politician, lawyer and founder of the Progress Party.
Robert Harling, 98, British typographer.
Dejan Medaković, 85, Serbian writer, historian, professor, president of Academy of Sciences and Arts (1999–2003).
Sir Richard Morris, 82, British industrialist.
John Pont, 80, American college football coach.
Mark Dean Schwab, 39, American murderer, execution by lethal injection.

2
Chris Arlman, 64, Dutch politician, heart attack.
Glencairn Balfour Paul, 90, British diplomat.
Omar Caetano, 69, Uruguayan football player.
Abdel Wahab El-Messiri, 70, Egyptian scholar and politician, cancer.
Jean-Pierre Muller, 83, French Olympic fencer.
Joe Nhlanhla, 71, South African politician, minister of Intelligence Services (1999–2001).
Simone Ortega, 89, Spanish culinary author.
Natasha Shneider, 52, Russian-born American actress (2010: The Year We Make Contact) and musician (Eleven), cancer.
Elizabeth Spriggs, 78, British stage, television and film actress (Sense and Sensibility, Harry Potter and the Sorcerer's Stone).

3
M. C. Ahamed, 77, Sri Lankan politician.
Sue Alexander, 74, American writer of children's literature.
Dan Cook, 81, American journalist (San Antonio Express-News, KENS-TV).
Ernie Cooksey, 28, British footballer (Oldham Athletic, Grays Athletic), melanoma.
Larry Harmon, 83, American entertainer (Bozo the Clown), heart failure.
Harald Heide-Steen Jr., 68, Norwegian actor and comedian, lung cancer.
Clive Hornby, 63, British actor (Emmerdale), cancer.
Kat Kinkade, 77, American co-founder of Twin Oaks Community, cancer.
Annabelle Lee, 86, American baseball player (All-American Girls Professional Baseball League).
Thomas Orley, 74, American Olympic fencer.
Dave Powers, 74, American Emmy Award-winning television director (Three's Company, The Carol Burnett Show), skin cancer.
Oliver Schroer, 53, Canadian fiddler, leukemia.
John Sedwick, 79, American television director.
Sayed Umerali Shihab Thangal, 66, Indian qadi, cancer.

4
Alfred Arteaga, 58, American Chicano poet, heart attack.
Thomas M. Disch, 68, American science fiction author (Camp Concentration, The Brave Little Toaster), suicide.
Jesse Helms, 86, American politician, senator from North Carolina (1973–2003), natural causes.
Evelyn Keyes, 91, American actress (Gone With the Wind), uterine cancer.
Terrence Kiel, 27, American football player (San Diego Chargers), car crash.
Wayne Pai, 55, Taiwanese businessman, founding chairman of Polaris Group, suicide.
Agneta Prytz, 91, Swedish actress, wife of Gösta Folke.
Janwillem van de Wetering, 77, Dutch writer.
Sir Charles Wheeler, 85, British journalist, longest serving BBC foreign correspondent, lung cancer.

5
Hasan Doğan, 52, Turkish president of the national football federation, cardiac arrest.
René Harris, 60, Nauruan president (1999–2000, 2001–2003, 2003, 2003–2004), cardiac arrest.
Dagfinn Næss, 74, Norwegian Olympic boxer.
Thích Huyền Quang, 88, Vietnamese religious leader, supreme patriarch of the Unified Buddhist Church of Vietnam.

6
Bob Ackles, 69, Canadian executive for the Canadian Football League's BC Lions, heart attack.
George Ambo, 85, Papua New Guinean Archbishop.
Jack Collins, 78, Australian footballer, premiership winner with Footscray (1954), heart attack.
Bobby Durham, 71, American jazz drummer.
Ambuya Mlambo, 84, Zimbabwean radio and television presenter, cancer.
Nonna Mordyukova, 82, Russian actress, diabetes.
Mando Ramos, 59, American former WBC and WBA World lightweight champion boxer.
George Tibbits, 74, Australian architect and composer.

7
Sultana bint Abdulaziz Al-Saud, 80, Saudi sister of King Abdullah.
Larry H. Abraham, 70, American businessman and author.
Ralph Ackerman, 67, American photographer, producer, traveler and lecturer.
Donald Allen, 81, Australian cricketer.
Bruce Conner, 74, American artist, natural causes.
Bruce Dalling, 69, South African yachtsman, heart attack.
Yitzchok Dovid Groner, 83, Australian Chabad rabbi.
Lear Fan, 27, American-bred, British-trained Thoroughbred racehorse and sire, natural causes.
Dorian Leigh, 91, American fashion model (Revlon), sister of Suzy Parker, Alzheimer's disease.
Clem McSpadden, 82, American politician, congressman from Oklahoma (1973–1975), cancer.
Hugh Mendl, 88, British record producer.
Giovanni Viola, 82, Italian football goalkeeper, natural causes.
Fred Yates, 85, British painter.

8
Alex d'Arbeloff, 80, American entrepreneur.
Wieńczysław Gliński, 87, Polish actor.
Erling Rønneberg, 84, Norwegian resistance trainer and politician, mayor of Ski (1958–1990).
Sir John Templeton, 95, British businessman and philanthropist, pneumonia.
Sir Anthony Troup, 86, British vice-admiral.

9
Séamus Brennan, 60, Irish politician, prostate cancer.
Wim de Beer, 75, Dutch field hockey player.
Don Eaddy, 74, American sportsman.
Elizabeth Fabac, 86, American baseball player (AAGPBL)
Charles H. Joffe, 78, American film producer (Annie Hall, Match Point, Hannah and Her Sisters), Oscar winner (1978), after long illness.
Sherman Lee, 90, American director of the Cleveland Museum of Art (1958–1983).
J. Murdoch Ritchie, 83, American biophysicist.
John West, 84, Australian broadcaster and theatre historian.

10
Hiroaki Aoki, 69, Japanese-born American founder of Benihana restaurants, pneumonia.
Bernard Cahier, 81, French Formula One photojournalist.
Don Devitt, 86, Australian politician.
Archie McCardell, 81, American business executive (Xerox, International Harvester).
Steve Mingori, 64, American baseball player (Kansas City Royals), natural causes.
Ayub Ommaya, 78, Pakistani neurosurgeon, Alzheimer's disease.
William W. Robertson, 66, American lawyer.
Mike Souchak, 81, American golfer, complications of heart attack.
Ahmad Suradji, 57, Indonesian serial killer, execution by firing squad.
Yoji Totsuka, 66, Japanese particle physicist, colorectal cancer.
Vindication, 8, American champion racehorse, euthanized.

11
Mahmood Ali, 79-80, Pakistani artist, cardiac arrest.
Joe Barr, 63, American editor and writer.
Michael DeBakey, 99, American cardiovascular surgeon and medical pioneer, natural causes.
Roy M. Huffington, 90, American oilman, diplomat and philanthropist, natural causes.
James H. Humphrey, 97, American physical education educator and researcher.
Mike Kleinhenz, 56, American voice actor, heart attack.
Breno Mello, 76, Brazilian actor (Black Orpheus) and footballer.
Chuck Stobbs, 79, American baseball pitcher, cancer.

12
Patricia Buckley Bozell, 81, American founder of Catholic journal Triumph, wife of L. Brent Bozell Jr., throat cancer.
Reinhard Fabisch, 57, German football manager, cancer.
Virginia B. MacDonald, 87, American politician, member of the Illinois House of Representatives and Illinois State Senate.
Bobby Murcer, 62, American baseball player and sportscaster (New York Yankees), brain cancer.
Earl Lee Nelson, 79, American R&B singer (Bob & Earl, The Hollywood Flames, Jackie Lee), Alzheimer's disease.
Olive Riley, 108, Australian woman believed to be the world's oldest blogger, natural causes.
Tony Snow, 53, American White House press secretary (2006–2007), Fox News presenter, colon cancer.
Tsay Jaw-yang, 67, Taiwanese politician, minister of Transportation and Communications, pneumonia.

13
Nicolas Arroyo, 90, Cuban architect, diplomat and minister.
Les Crane, 74, American talk show host, Grammy Award winner ("Desiderata").
Peter Durack, 81, Australian senator and attorney-general (1977–1983).
Red Foley, 79, American sportswriter and baseball official scorer.
Bronisław Geremek, 76, Polish social historian and politician, minister of Foreign Affairs (1997–2000), car accident.
John Raymond Hobbs, 79, British physician, lung cancer.
John Mabuku, Namibian politician, governor of Caprivi Region, supporter of Caprivi Strip secessionist movement.
Dave Ricketts, 73, American baseball player and coach (St. Louis Cardinals), renal cancer.
Dona Spring, 55, American disability rights activist and Green politician, Berkeley city councilor since 1992, rheumatoid arthritis.
Gerald Wiggins, 86, American jazz pianist.

14
Miguel Benavides, 68, Cuban actor.
Y. V. Chandrachud, 88, Indian jurist, Chief Justice (1978–1985).
Bryan Cowgill, 81, British television executive.
John Danzenbaker, 89, American birdwatcher, pancreatic cancer.
Henki Kolstad, 93, Norwegian actor.
Luke Kruytbosch, 47, American race caller, natural causes.
Teta Lando, 60, Angolan musician, cancer.
Hugh Lloyd, 85, British actor (Hancock's Half Hour).
George Noakes, 83, Welsh Anglican prelate, Archbishop of Wales (1987–1991).
*Ong Chit Chung, 59, Singaporean politician.
Katie Reider, 30, American singer and songwriter, cerebral hemorrhage and cancer.
Riek Schagen, 94, Dutch actress and artist. 
Mike Schutte, 57, South African boxer, cancer.
Steven Thomas, 36, American entrepreneur missing since 30 June, body found on this date after fall from Pali Lookout.

15
Peter Ala Adjetey, 76, Ghanaian lawyer and politician.
Ahmad Basri Akil, 69, Malaysian football manager.
György Kolonics, 36, Hungarian Olympic canoeing gold medallist (1996, 2000), heart failure.
Yuri Mikhaylov, 77, Russian speed skater.
Gionata Mingozzi, 23, Italian footballer (Treviso F.B.C. 1993), car accident.
Derek W. Moore, 77, British mathematician.
Steve Peterson, 58, American NASCAR technical director, natural causes.
Tang Aoqing, 92, Chinese chemist, President of Jilin University (1978–1986).
Karl Unterkircher, 37, Italian mountaineer and explorer, fall on Nanga Parbat.
Gennadi Volnov, 68, Russian basketball player for Soviet Union, 1972 Olympic gold medallist.

16
Sir Eric Dunn, 80, British air marshal.
Roger Landes, 91, British Special Operations Executive agent.
Sherman Maxwell, 100, American Negro league baseball sportscaster.
Peanuts O'Flaherty, 90, Canadian ice hockey player.
Jo Stafford, 90, American traditional pop singer ("You Belong to Me"), heart failure.
Lindsay Thompson, 84, Australian politician, premier of Victoria (1981–1982), pneumonia.

17
Lila T. Abaunza, 79, Nicaraguan first lady (2002–2007), wife of President Enrique Bolaños.
Giorgio Ceragioli, 78, Italian engineer, professor and a leader in the pro-Third World movement, Parkinson's disease.
Creig Flessel, 96, American comic book artist.
Johny Fonck, 87, Luxembourgian Olympic athlete.
Larry Haines, 89, American actor (Search for Tomorrow, The Odd Couple).
John Hunt, Baron Hunt of Tanworth, 88, British civil servant and politician, cabinet secretary (1973–1979).
Mick Ibbett, 80, Australian politician, member of the New South Wales Legislative Council (1984–1991).
George Niven, 79, Scottish football goalkeeper (Rangers, Partick Thistle).
M. P. Shankar, 72, Indian actor.
Paul Sorensen, 82, American actor (Dallas, Hang 'Em High, Star Trek III: The Search for Spock).
Sir Graham Speight, 86, New Zealand High Court judge, chief justice of the Cook Islands.
Ma Prem Usha, 70, Indian tarot card reader and columnist, natural causes.

18
Yardley Chittick, 107, American patent attorney, injuries sustained in a fall.
Tauno Marttinen, 95, Finnish composer.
Khosrow Shakibai, 64, Iranian actor, liver cancer.
Dennis Townhill, 83, British chorister and organist.
Peter Welsh, 54, Australian footballer (Hawthorn, Richmond), cancer.

19
Robert Berning, 73, American grocer, principal wine buyer for Trader Joe's, bone cancer.
Sarah Conlon, 82, British campaigner on behalf of Guildford Four and Maguire Seven, lung cancer.
Eddie Fuller, 76, South African cricketer.
Dercy Gonçalves, 101, Brazilian actress, pneumonia.
Samudra Gupta, 62, Bangladeshi poet, gallbladder cancer.
Jerome Holtzman, 82, American baseball writer, stroke.
Ann Lambton, 96, British historian, after long illness.
Robert Nesheim, 86, American nutritionist (Quaker Oats), developed Cap'n Crunch and Life breakfast cereals, prostate cancer.
Dave Pearson, 70, British painter.

20
Célio de Castro, 76, Brazilian politician, mayor of Belo Horizonte (1997–2001), natural causes.
Jim Johnson, 83, British army officer.
Yann Richter, 80, Swiss politician, president of the FDP (1978–1984), heart disease.
Dinko Šakić, 86, Croatian fascist leader of the Independent State of Croatia in World War II, heart failure.
Artie Traum, 65, American folk singer and guitarist, cancer.
Charles Z. Wick, 90, American politician, director of USIA (1981–1988), natural causes.

21
Harry Åkerfelt, 93, Finnish canoeist.
Sidney Craig, 76, Canadian entrepreneur and thoroughbred horse owner, co-founder of Jenny Craig, Inc.
Eric Dowling, 92, British prisoner of war, helped plan The Great Escape from Stalag Luft III.
Antoni Jaszczak, 62, Polish economist, politician and minister of construction (2006).
K-Swift, 29, American radio personality.
El Kazovsky, 58, Russian-born Hungarian painter and artist. 
Donald Stokes, Baron Stokes, 94, British industrialist and chief executive of British Leyland (1964–1968).
Muhlis Tayfur, 85/86, Turkish Olympic wrestler.
María Vaner, 73, Argentine actress.
Adil Zulfikarpašić, 86, Bosnian businessman and philanthropist, natural causes.

22
Ballindaggin, 23, American Thoroughbred racehorse, euthanized.
Joe Beck, 62, American jazz guitarist.
Helen Brockman, 105, American fashion designer, author and professor, natural causes.
Greg Burson, 59, American voice actor (Jurassic Park, Tiny Toon Adventures, Garfield and Friends).
Patrick Connor, 81, British actor (Brazil, Eye of the Needle).
Maurice Coomarawel, 68, Sri Lankan Olympic cyclist.
Helen Gardiner, 70, Canadian philanthropist, pancreatic cancer.
Estelle Getty, 84, American actress (The Golden Girls, Empty Nest, Mask), Lewy body dementia.
Victor A. McKusick, 86, American geneticist, architect of the Human Genome Project, cancer.

23
Anna Maria Cantù, 84, Italian Olympic sprinter.
N. Robin Crossby, 54, Canadian game designer, creator of Hârn role-playing system, cancer.
Kurt Furgler, 84, Swiss member of the Federal Council (1972–1986), heart failure.
Ahmet Hadžipašić, 56, Bosnian politician, prime minister (2003–2007), heart attack.
Frank Schweihs, 78, American reputed mafia enforcer, cancer.
Carol Vitale, 59, American playmate (1974) and talk show host.
Clay T. Whitehead, 69, American director of White House Office of Telecommunications Policy (1970–1974), prostate cancer.

24
Lawrence Anastasia, 81, American politician.
Bruce Clarke, 82, Australian jazz guitarist.
Eddie Davidson, 35, American convicted spammer and prison escapee, suicide by gunshot.
Norman Dello Joio, 95, American composer, natural causes.
Zezé Gonzaga, 81, Brazilian singer, natural causes.
Robert T. Herres, 75, American Air Force general, vice chairman of the Joint Chiefs of Staff (1987–1990), brain cancer.
David H. Popper, 95, American diplomat, ambassador to Cyprus (1969–1973) and Chile (1974–1977), complications from a fall.

25
Bruce Adler, 63, American actor, liver cancer.
Bud Browne, 96, American surf film maker.
Hiram Bullock, 52, American jazz guitarist, throat cancer.
Harriet Burns, 79, American artist, first woman to work at Walt Disney Imagineering, heart complications.
Don Callander, 78, American fantasy novel author.
Jamiel Chagra, 63, American drug trafficker, cancer.
Michael J. Daly, 83, American Medal of Honor recipient, cancer.
Jeff Fehring, 53, Australian footballer, suicide.
Johnny Griffin, 80, American jazz saxophonist.
Tracy Hall, 88, American physical chemist, Alzheimer's disease.
Joseph P. Landry, 86, Canadian businessman, senator (1996–1997).
Carrie Allen McCray, 94, American author.
Randy Pausch, 47, American computer science professor (Carnegie Mellon) and author (The Last Lecture), pancreatic cancer.
Mikhail Pugovkin, 85, Russian actor, diabetes.
Herizo Razafimahaleo, 53, Malagasy politician, renal failure.

26
Nadir Abdurrahmanov, 82, Azerbaijani painter.
Malik Anokha, 65, Pakistani actor, heart attack.
Daniel Bukantz, 90, American Olympic fencer.
Bruna Colombetti-Peroncini, 72, Italian Olympic fencer.
Roland B. Day, 89, American judge, Wisconsin Supreme Court Justice (1974–1996).
Ed Foster, 59, American technology columnist (InfoWorld), heart attack.
Chas Messenger, 94, British racing cyclist.
William H. Rogers, 94, British architect.

27
Raymonde Allain, 96, French model and actress.
Osvaldo Álvarez Guerrero, 67, Argentine politician, cerebral hemorrhage.
Carl Aschan, 102, Swedish-born British intelligence officer and spy during World War II.
Marie Kachel Bucher, 98, American teacher, last surviving resident of the Ephrata Cloister.
Youssef Chahine, 82, Egyptian film director, cerebral hemorrhage.
Graeme Crallan, 50, British rock drummer (White Spirit, Tank), head injuries from fall.
Bob Crampsey, 78, British football journalist, after long illness.
Russ Gibson, 69, American baseball catcher.
Tomio Hosoda, 82, Japanese Olympic sprinter.
Russell Johnston, Baron Russell-Johnston, 75, British politician, cancer.
Fenwick Lansdowne, 71, Canadian wildlife artist.
Marisa Merlini, 84, Italian actress.
Isaac Saba Raffoul, 84, Mexican businessman.
Julius B. Richmond, 91, American vice admiral, surgeon general (1977–1981), cancer.
Horst Stein, 80, German conductor.
Jean Stonell, 79, New Zealand cricketer.

28
Pierre Berès, 95, French bookseller.
Wendo Kolosoy, 83, Congolese musician, after long illness.
Bob Margarita, 87, American football player (Chicago Bears), pneumonia.
Midhat Mursi, 55, Egyptian al-Qaeda chemical weapons expert, missile strike.
Margaret Ringenberg, 87, American aviator and airplane racer, natural causes.
Syahrir, 63, Indonesian economist and political activist, lung cancer.
Suzanne Tamim, 30, Lebanese singer and actress, stabbed.
Anatoly Tyazhlov, 66, Russian politician, governor of Moscow Oblast (1991–2000).

29
Joseph Batten, 36, American game developer, suicide by gunshot.
Melissa Batten, 36, American game developer (Halo 3, Gears of War), shot.
Eula Beal, 89, American opera singer.
Luther Davis, 91, American playwright and screenwriter.
Edie Huggins, 72, American journalist and reporter (WCAU-TV), lung cancer.
Bruce Edwards Ivins, 62, American microbiologist suspected of 2001 anthrax attacks, suicide by drug overdose.
Mate Parlov, 59, Croatian boxer, Olympic and World Boxing Council light-heavyweight champion, lung cancer.
Earlene Risinger, 81, American baseball player (All-American Girls Professional Baseball League).
Ishmeet Singh, 18, Indian singer, drowned.
Eric Varley, Baron Varley, 75, British politician, Secretary of State for Industry (1975–1979), cancer.
June Walker, 74, American activist, President of Hadassah.

30
Anne Armstrong, 80, American diplomat and politician, ambassador to the United Kingdom (1976–1977), cancer.
Peter Coke, 95, British actor (Paul Temple) and playwright.
Alfonso Dantés, 65, Mexican professional wrestler.
Vittorio Fiorucci, 75, Canadian graphic artist, stroke.
Anette Fredriksson, 48, Swedish Olympic swimmer.
Tim McLean, 22, Canadian homicide victim, stabbed.
Jack Nash, 79, German-born American businessman and hedge fund pioneer.
Leif Pettersen, 57, Canadian footballer and sportscaster, heart attack.

31
Falani Aukuso, 69, Tokelauan politician, deputy director general of the Secretariat of the Pacific Community.
Blagoje Bratić, 62, Bosnian footballer.
Athos Bulcão, 90, Brazilian painter and sculptor, Parkinson's disease.
Alice Chalifoux, 100, American harpist with the Cleveland Orchestra (1931–1974).
Hirosi Ismael, 72, Micronesian politician, Vice President (1987–1991).
Yi Chong-jun, 68, South Korean novelist, lung cancer.
Lee Young, 94, American jazz drummer.

References

2008-07
 07